Kazaklambia is an extinct genus of herbivorous lambeosaurine dinosaur known from the Late Cretaceous Dabrazinskaya Svita (Santonian stage) of southern Kazakhstan. It contains a single species, Kazaklambia convincens.

Discovery and naming
Kazaklambia was first described in 1968 as a species of Procheneosaurus by Anatoly Konstantinovich Rozhdestvensky: Procheneosaurus convincens. The specific name refers to the fact that the specimen, the most complete dinosaur fossil ever discovered on Soviet territory, convincingly proved that dinosaurs could be found above the so-called "dinosaur horizon". After having for a time been referred to as Corythosaurus convincens, it was given its own genus in 2013 by Phil R. Bell and Kirstin S. Brink. Their new genus name means "Kazakh lambeosaurine", referring both to its discovery location and its classification. Kazaklambia is known from a nearly complete skeleton of a juvenile missing only the snout, the front of the lower jaws, some dorsal vertebrae and end of the tail, holotype PIN 2230, found by G.A. Belenkiy in 1961. Although some studies considered it to be possibly synonymous with Jaxartosaurus aralensis, others found the species to be valid.

Description
Bell & Brink suggested that Kazaklambia is morphologically distinct from other Eurasian taxa and known juvenile lambeosaurines at a similar ontogenetic stage in having a prefrontal process of the postorbital with a thickened dome lateral to the frontal dome, doming of the nasal above and in front of the orbit, and a frontal length/width ratio of less than one.

Classification
Bell and Brink (2013) assigned Kazaklambia to the Lambeosaurinae, in a basal position.  Morphometrics and morphological information suggest that Kazaklambia might be closely related to the basal lambeosaurines from Asia Amurosaurus and Tsintaosaurus, which was seen as proving an Asian origin of the Lambeosaurinae.

See also

 Timeline of hadrosaur research

References

Lambeosaurines
Late Cretaceous dinosaurs of Asia
Santonian life
Fossils of Kazakhstan
Fossil taxa described in 2013
Ornithischian genera